Baron Franz Xaver von Pillersdorf (1 March 178622 February 1862) was an Austrian statesman.

Life and career 
Born in Brno as the son of a judge, Pillersdorf after a legal education in Vienna in 1805 started his public service career in Galicia. In 1807, he returned to Vienna as assistant to the court councillor Baron von Baldacci. This put him in the centre of the action when the war with Napoleon broke out. In the disadvantageous peace according to the 1809 Treaty of Schönbrunn that followed, the Austrian foreign minister Johann Philipp von Stadion had to resign and a new ministry was formed, with Prince Metternich at its head. Baldacci moved to the periphery of power, but Pillersdorff advanced to court secretary and then became a court councillor. Here, Pillersdorff had ample opportunity to acquaint himself with the great disarray in the operation of the Austrian state, and how necessary reform was, but uncommonly difficult to implement.

The events of 1812-1815 increased the oppressive political climate still more. Baldacci became minister of the army and headed the administration of the occupied zones in France, and Pillersdorf was put at his side. Pillersdorf's stay in France and travels to the United Kingdom allowed him to make comparative studies and think about how the people could start participating in lawmaking and government in Austria as well. But the time had not come for such changes in Austria, since Emperor Francis I kept the reins of power tightly to himself.

After the Napoleonic Wars, Austrian finances urgently required attention. The paper money issued amounted to ƒ700  million, but at least a portion of this disappeared from circulation and was replaced by specie. By 1830, there was even the prospect of a surplus in the treasury. This situation brought to the fore the question of whether or not the government should be representative, for to maintain the partially achieved financial order, the participation of the public in financial management was needed, as well as confidence that the ministries would not overstep their budgets. The future of Austria lay in the solution of this question, for the financial element comprised much more important affairs. But those near the throne did not want to see the solution of the financial question turn into a question of a constitution — yet that was its essence.

The French July Revolution of 1830 heightened the tension in the various classes of the population. In 1832, Pillersdorf, who thought that concerns about conflict with the new government in France should not frustrate attempts to bring more order to Austria's finances, was taken away from finances and moved to the chancellery, where he became a privy councillor (Geheimrat) on the inner track of the government. A new field opened itself to him where no skilled hand had been on the plough since the reign of Emperor Joseph II. All kinds of weeds needed to be pulled, and obstacles removed, in order to create a foundation for public welfare which until now had not been allowed to develop. As stubbornly as the current order was maintained, so public discontent with it became greater. Even patriotic men faced with a sort of longing the storm that rose up from the French July Monarchy and unleashed itself on Austria.

In the Revolutions of 1848, the brittle government collapsed. On 13 March, Prince Metternich resigned. Pillersdorf became Minister of the Interior under Count Kolowrat on 20 March and submitted the Pillersdorf Constitution on 25 April. He was appointed Minister-President on 4 May. If he had hoped for a moment to be able to calmly and gradually reorganise the government, everything conspired against his honest intention — the turmoil in Lombardy and Hungary, the unrest in Vienna, and relations with the states of the German Confederation. The unexpected flight of Emperor Ferdinand I made it an affair of honour for the prime minister not to resign, and Pillersdorf remained true to his post. He held fast to the concessions made by the crown, but the resistance he offered to constantly emerging new demands was too weak. He avoided the summoning of the government's sources of influence. In the meantime, public affairs came into such confusion and disarray, and Pillersdorf showed himself so little suited to manage them and create order, that finally on 8 July he resigned.

Pillersdorf then was elected as a deputy of the Austrian Reichstag, or Kremsier Parliament (Assembly at Kroměříž), which was constituted on 22 July. Here, he took his place centre-right with the men who earnestly wanted to support the new government. Never was there a vote in which he did not take the government's side. When the  Reichstag was dissolved in 1849, Pillersdorf's ministerial activity, as well as his behavior during the days of September leading to the Vienna Uprising, became the subject of a disciplinary investigation. Pillersdorf's  efforts during his career were directed, as he himself said, toward "reinforcing the power and prestige of the government and instilling confidence in it by avoiding motives for dissatisfaction through suggestions for peaceful reforms."

Pillersdorf went into deep seclusion. His lot was to stand, "not amongst those who had been judged, but among those who had been shamed." But his fellow citizens sought to heal these wounds: when constitutional government returned to Austria in 1861, they confidently called him to the newly established Reichsrat house of representatives. The old man, who had reached the end of his days, took up the mandate with joyful readiness and uprightly performed the duties of his office as head of the finance committee until his death in the following year.

Honours 
 Order of Saint Stephen of Hungary

References 
 Hanns Schlitter, “Pillersdorf, Franz Freiherr von” in Allgemeine Deutsche Biographie, Band 26 (Leipzig, 1888), S. 135-137. 
 Carl Schurz, Lebenserinnerungen biz zum Jahre 1852, Berlin: Georg Reimer, 1906 and 1911.  Schurz mentions Pillersdorf in Chapter 5 and says that as prime minister he consulted with students as part of the process of drafting a new press law.

1786 births
1862 deaths
Politicians from Brno
People from the Margraviate of Moravia
Moravian-German people
Moravian nobility
Barons of Austria
19th-century Ministers-President of Austria
Interior ministers of Austria
Members of the Imperial Diet (Austria)
Members of the Austrian House of Deputies (1861–1867)